Na'ameh, or Haret en Naameh, is a Lebanese coastal town located in the Chouf District, an administrative division of the Mount Lebanon Governorate. Naameh was the site of protests regarding waste disposal in 2014.

Sunni Muslims make up the majority of the population, with 25,000 inhabitants. There are also 4,000 Christian Maronites and Druze, as well as many Syrian refugees. 

Common families include Mezher, Matar, Fakhreddine, Chahin, Khouri, Atwi, Hammoud, Hatoum, and Hamza.

On 9 December 1988 Israeli commandos attacked the PFLP-GC base near Na’ameh. The attack went badly wrong with the leader of the operation being killed.

On 10 January 1992 an Israeli air strike above Na'ameh killed three members of a Palestinian militia, PFLP-GC. The attack also destroyed a encampment of the Nawar, nomadic gypsies, killing seven women and two children.

Another Israeli airstrike, 15 January 1995, killed three people and caused several other casualties.

See also
PFLP-GC Headquarters Raid (1988)

References

Populated places in Chouf District
Sunni Muslim communities in Lebanon